Princes Highway is a major road in Australia, extending from Sydney via Melbourne to Adelaide through the states of New South Wales, Victoria and South Australia.

The highway follows the coastline for most of its length, and thus takes quite an indirect and lengthy route. Because of the rural nature and lower traffic volumes over much of its length, Princes Highway is a more scenic and leisurely route than the main highways between these major cities.

Route

New South Wales

Princes Highway starts at the junction of Broadway (Great Western Highway) and City Road in the Sydney suburb of Chippendale. City Road in fact forms the first section of the highway, and becomes King Street, Newtown, also part of Princes Highway. Where King Street ends at Sydney Park Road, Princes Highway continues in its own right.

The highway in this section is constructed as a six-lane divided carriageway, other than along King Street (four-lane undivided) and along the western edge of the Royal National Park, where it is built as four-lane dual carriageway. 

The only major engineering structures along its route are the twin Tom Uglys Bridge across Georges River. The northbound bridge is of steel truss construction, opened in 1929, whilst the southbound bridge is of prestressed concrete girders, opened in 1987.

It runs through Sydney's southern suburbs (the St George area and Sutherland Shire), via Kogarah, Sutherland and Engadine to the village of Waterfall.

South of Waterfall the highway is paralleled by the  Princes Motorway (national route M1) to the top of Bulli Pass outside the city of Wollongong, which carries the majority of traffic.

The Mount Ousley Road-Princes Motorway route is the inter-city and main urban arterial through Wollongong's southern suburbs, whereas the Princes Highway acts as a local arterial.

From the interchange with the Princes Motorway at Yallah, the Princes Highway continues through the bypassed Albion Park Rail before reaching the southern terminus of the motorway at the Oak Flats interchange. From Oak Flats, the Princes Highway is dual carriageway, mostly of freeway standard, with the exception of the Kiama bends at Kiama Heights. 

The highway then travels along the upgraded sections through Gerringong and Foxground before bypassing the town of Berry, where the highway follows larger gradients, compared to the flat terrain the Illawarra railway line follows immediately to the east.

Beyond Mullers Lane, Berry, the highway is a single two lane carriageway to Cambewarra Road, . Construction is underway for the duplication of the highway from Mullers Lane to Cambewarra Road and is expected to be completed in 2022.

Duplication to dual carriageway standard of a  length south from here to Forest Road was scheduled for completion in early 2014, following a three-month cessation of work while measures were put in place to protect a hitherto unknown area of habitat of the endangered green and golden bell frog.

Current identified future projects are a bypass of Nowra-Bomaderry (definite route identified only for section south of Shoalhaven River), and a bypass of Ulladulla-Milton.

In 2007 the NRMA claimed Princes Highway was a dangerous road with ten fatalities and 729 people injured on the highway between Sydney and the state border in 2006.

Victoria 

In Victoria, Princes Highway follows a very long and complex route. The route within metropolitan Melbourne carries the original individual names of sections of Princes Highway on signage. Each road section has Princes Highway labelled in bold and the individual name in brackets, such as Dandenong Road or Geelong Road.

Apart from the routes Alt National Route 1, C101 and C109 (in the outer metropolitan areas – such as Berwick and Werribee), the M1 Freeway route intersects (Monash Freeway/CityLink/West Gate Freeway/Princes Freeway) and this carries the much higher volume of traffic, including congestion in the peak periods, serving as the major, most direct and quickest route for Route 1 in Australia.

The highway passes (from east to west) through Orbost, Bairnsdale and Sale in the Gippsland region. The highway then passes through the Latrobe Valley, bypassing Morwell, Warragul and Pakenham to Dandenong and into the south-eastern suburbs of Melbourne. Most of this section is freeway standard, with the main outstanding work being a freeway bypass of Traralgon, although the highway through Traralgon has already been built to urban dual carriageway standard.

As the road passes through Melbourne, it first follows the route of Lonsdale Street (through Dandenong), then Dandenong Road to St Kilda, and Queens Road through Albert Park (this section of highway is shown in the 1969 Melbourne Transportation Plan as part of the F14 freeway corridor). Closer to Melbourne city centre, it follows the route of Kings Way, and then King Street through central Melbourne. It then follows Curzon Street after leaving the central business district to enter North Melbourne, and then follows Flemington Road northwest, then Racecourse Road, Smithfield Road and Ballarat Road. It starts again as Geelong Road where Geelong Road branches southwest off Ballarat Road, and Ballarat Road leads onto Western Freeway. The reason for the confusing dual naming of the highway through Melbourne is that it follows streets and roads which were already named when the highway was named in 1920.

Through much of Melbourne and its suburbs, the designation of National Route 1 is not along Princes Highway, but rather Monash Freeway, which intersects the Princes Highway on the eastern outskirts of Melbourne, then the southern link of the CityLink tollway, and then West Gate Freeway which bypasses central Melbourne. This avoids the confusing and congested arrangement of roads that is the Princes Highway in central Melbourne. The M1 include an advanced freeway management system for its entire  urban length, between Narre Warren and Werribee. Along with freeway sensors and associated data stations, overhead lane use management system (LUMS) gantries that show speed and lane availability, electronic message boards, real-time drive time signs and arterial road real-time Information signs (before the on-ramps); there are the 64+ ramp signal and metering sites. Hence, the majority of the on-ramps are traffic light controlled, depending on the density and speed of the traffic.

Heading towards Geelong in a south-west direction, the West Gate Freeway and Geelong Road join and become the Princes Freeway. Which, unusually for an Australian inter-city freeway, carries enough traffic to merit four to three lanes in either direction (often still being congested in the morning and afternoon peaks). On the northern outskirts of Geelong, the highway reverts from freeway to three lane dual carriageway through Geelong and its suburbs, with traffic light-controlled at-grade intersections. Through Geelong the highway is often heavily congested.

With the completion of the freeway standard Geelong Ring Road during 2008–9, the M1 route follows the freeway-standard road from Winchelsea to Traralgon, without encountering any traffic lights (with the exception of Yarragon and Trafalgar, which are yet to be bypassed). The ring road rejoins the original highway at Waurn Ponds on the western edge of Geelong.

Within Geelong, Princes Highway starts at the junction of Princes Freeway in the northern Geelong suburb of Corio, and runs through Geelong's northern and southern suburbs via an inner-city western bypass of the Geelong City Centre, to the current Highway 1 segment of the Princes Highway at Waurn Ponds in Geelong's southern suburbs. The highway is six lane dual carriageway from Corio to Latrobe Terrace, continuing as a four-lane dual carriageway to Waurn Ponds. The 1989 re-alignment of Princes Highway (along La Trobe Terrace) provides a dual carriageway, four-lane limited access road to replace the original route along Moorabool Street in South Geelong and High Street in Belmont. Upon the completion of the final section of the Geelong Ring Road, another section of the Princes Highway was superseded in 2013 at Waurn Ponds.

After Geelong the highway heads in a generally western direction, continuing with the 'M1' designation as a dual carriageway road to Winchelsea (opened 2015). West of Winchelsea, the road is presently being reconstructed to dual carriageway standard, passing through Colac, before reaching Camperdown - ultimately reaching the port of Warrnambool. The section from Geelong to Warrnambool runs inland, and so avoids the slower, but scenic Great Ocean Road. From here, Princes Highway passes through Portland before crossing the border into South Australia.

South Australia 
At Mount Gambier the highway takes a more northward tack as the coast curves to the northwest, passing the Coorong National Park. After Kingston SE, it turns inland (north) to avoid the lakes at the mouth of the River Murray. Shortly before Tailem Bend it is joined by Dukes Highway, part of the main route between Melbourne and Adelaide. The highway then turns north-west and becomes South Eastern Freeway, crosses the Murray River, bypasses Murray Bridge and continues to Glen Osmond on Adelaide's southeastern outskirts.

It continues north-west via Glen Osmond Road to eventually terminate just south of the Adelaide city centre.

History
The section of Princes Highway between West Helensburgh and Bulli Tops was the original coastal route between Sydney and Wollongong, first used in 1843. From Bulli Tops this route continued south along today's Mount Ousley Road as far south as Mount Keira Road, and then followed Mount Keira Road around the west of Mount Keira. This route replaced the inland route from Sydney via  to Bulli Tops.

As a named route, the highway came into being when pre-existing roads were renamed Prince's Highway after the planned visit to Australia by the Prince of Wales (later to become king Edward VIII and, after abdicating, the Duke of Windsor) in 1920. The original submissions in January 1920 were in order for the Prince to have the opportunity during his visit to make the trip from Melbourne to Sydney overland along the route. Different routes were considered, including the inland route via . That idea never came to fruition, due partly to the limited amount of time and the cost of upgrading the road to a suitable standard for him to undertake the trip. The Prince did, however, give his permission for the naming.

The highway had opening ceremonies in both New South Wales and Victoria during 1920. The first section of road from Melbourne was opened on 10 August in Warragul. The road from Sydney was opened in Bulli on 19 October, by the NSW Minister for Local Government, Thomas Mutch.

Within New South Wales, the passing of the Main Roads Act of 1924 through the Parliament of New South Wales provided for the declaration of Main Roads, roads partially funded by the State government through the Main Roads Board (later the Department of Main Roads, and eventually Transport for NSW). Main Road No. 1 was declared along Prince's Highway on 8 August 1928, heading south from the City of Sydney through Sutherland, Wollongong, Nowra, Bateman's Bay and Eden to the southern boundary of the state towards Genoa in Victoria (for a total of 351.5 miles). With the passing of the Main Roads (Amendment) Act of 1929 to provide for additional declarations of State Highways and Trunk Roads, this was amended to State Highway 1 on 8 April 1929. Before the adoption of the "Prince's Highway" name in 1920, the road between Sydney and the border was referred to as the Coast Road.

Within Victoria, approval was given by the Victorian executive in January 1922 to extend the highway west from Melbourne through Geelong, Camperdown, Warrnambool and Portland to the South Australian border. The passing of the Highways and Vehicles Act of 1924 through the Parliament of Victoria provided for the declaration of State Highways, roads two-thirds financed by the State government through the Country Roads Board (later VicRoads). Prince's Highway was declared a State Highway on 1 July 1925, traversing the whole length of the State from its western boundary near Mount Gambier in South Australia, through Port Fairy, Warrnambool, Geelong to Melbourne, through Dandenong, Warragul, Sale, Bairnsdale and Orbost to the eastern boundary of the state towards Eden in New South Wales (for a total of 540 miles); before the adoption of the "Prince's Highway" name in 1920, the road between Melbourne and Bairnsdale was referred to as (Main) Gippsland Road, between Bairnsdale and the NSW border as Orbost-Genoa Road and Genoa-Eden Road, and between Melbourne and Port Fairy as Melbourne-Geelong Road, Geelong-Warrnambool Road and Warrnambool-Port Fairy Road.

Within South Australia, roads from Adelaide to the South Australian border with Victoria were renamed by the State government in February 1922. At that time, the route from Adelaide was via Aldgate, Mylor, Macclesfield, Strathalbyn, Langhorne Creek, crossing the Murray River at Wellington, then continuing along the present towns of Meningie, Kingston SE, Robe, Beachport, Millicent and Gambier Town (Mount Gambier). By 1928, the route went through Mount Barker and Wistow to Langhorne Creek. By 1935, the Princes Highway passed through Nairne and Kanmantoo, Murray Bridge and Tailem Bend (now known as the Old Princes Highway). That road was superseded by the South Eastern Freeway (Crafers-Murray Bridge in stages 1967–1979), Swanport Bridge (1979), finally extended from Crafers to Glen Osmond (2000). The section between Kingston SE and Millicent has also been replaced by a more direct inland route. The coastal route through Robe and Beachport is now route B101, the Southern Ports Highway.

This route forms part of Mount Ousley Road.

The passing of the Roads Act of 1993 through the Parliament of New South Wales updated road classifications and the way they could be declared within New South Wales. Under this act, Princes Highway today retains its declaration as Highway 1, from the intersection with Broadway in Chippendale in Sydney, to the state border with Victoria.

The passing of the Road Management Act 2004 through the Parliament of Victoria granted the responsibility of overall management and development of Victoria's major arterial roads to VicRoads: VicRoads re-declared the road in 2010 as Princes Highway West (Arterial #6500), beginning at the state border with South Australia to Geelong, then from Altona North to Parkville; and in 2008 as Princes Highway East (Arterial #6510), beginning at the Melbourne CBD to Narre Warren, then through Yarragon, Trafalgar and Morwell, the from Morwell to the state border with New South Wales.

In August 2011, the stretch of the highway in South Australia between Adelaide and Port Augusta (commonly referred to as "Highway 1") was renamed Port Wakefield Highway (between Adelaide and Port Wakefield) and Augusta Highway (between Port Wakefield and Port Augusta) as part of a process to standardise the rural property addressing system across the state.

Timeline of significant upgrades and bypasses

Projects

Route allocation
Princes Highway was signed National Route 1 across its entire length in 1955. The Whitlam Government introduced the federal National Roads Act 1974, where roads declared as a National Highway were still the responsibility of the states for road construction and maintenance, but were fully compensated by the Federal government for money spent on approved projects. As an important interstate link between the capitals of South Australia and Victoria, the parts of Princes Highway not already replaced by South Eastern Freeway between Adelaide and Tailem Bend were declared a National Highway in 1974. With all three states' conversion to their newer alphanumeric systems between the late 1990s to the early 2010s, its former route number for the most part was updated to A1 for the highway within Victoria (in 1997), South Australia (in 1998), and eventually the New South Wales section (in 2013), but with many exceptions: see below.

Due to its history of bypasses, many sections of Princes Highway today have different route allocations. These allocations, from its northern terminus in Sydney to its western terminus in Adelaide, are:

Former routes
The gazetted route of Princes Highway today differs from the route of State Route 60 (and from that shown on road signs).

See also 

 Highway 1 (Australia)
 Highway 1 (South Australia)
 Highways in Australia
 Highways in Victoria
 List of highways in New South Wales
 List of highways in South Australia
Princes Freeway

References

External links 

 RTA Webcam Suburban Sydney
VicRoads (Victorian road departmen)

Highways and freeways in Melbourne
Highways in New South Wales
Highways in South Australia
Highways in Victoria (Australia)
Streets in Sydney
Transport in Geelong
Highway 1 (Australia)
City of Shellharbour
Georges River Council
Bayside Council
Transport in Barwon South West (region)